Steven Thiruneelakandan is a Malaysian attorney and former President of the Malaysian Bar. He is a senior partner of Messrs. Steven Thiru & Sudhar Partnership, a firm specializing solely in dispute resolution; and was a litigation partner of Messrs Shook Lin & Bok from 2000 to 2018. He has been in practice since 1992. His main areas of practice are administrative law, employment law, electricity supply law, native title law, and a variety of areas of civil litigation; and his new firm specializes solely in the different areas of dispute resolution.

Steven was recognised by Chambers Asia Pacific 2016 in the area of dispute resolution as having “a broad practice that encompasses employment, commercial and administrative litigation. He is considered a ‘very solid, very hard-working’ practitioner of impressively varied experience by market sources.”

Further, in the area of employment and industrial relations, he is described as having “a long-standing reputation in the market and is considered ‘a very good lawyer’ by his peers. His practice comprises varied employment law disputes as well as judicial review applications.”

Education
Steven read law at the University of Leicester and graduated in 1990. He was called to the Bar of England and Wales at Middle Temple in 1991, and was admitted as an Advocate and Solicitor of the High Court of Malaya in 1992. Steven holds a Masters in Laws (LL.M) degree from University Malaya (2000).

References

Malaysian people of Indian descent

20th-century Malaysian lawyers

21st-century Malaysian lawyers
Malaysian Christians
Alumni of the University of Leicester
Living people
Members of the Middle Temple
Year of birth missing (living people)